David Graves is a DC Comics supervillain, and enemy of the Justice League. He was created by Geoff Johns and Jim Lee, and first appeared in Justice League (vol. 2) No. 6 (April 2012) during "The New 52".

Creation
David Graves was created by Justice League writer Geoff Johns and artist Jim Lee. Johns described Graves as a character who would take the classical monomyth or "hero's journey" narrative device, and turn it on its head, illustrating how a villain would go through a twisted version of it, becoming a major threat for the Justice League.

Fictional character biography
David Graves was a historian and published author, interested in fringe history. He wrote a series of books, on subjects such as Atlantis, the miracles of Fatima, the Nazca Lines, and how they could affect the modern world. During the very first adventure of the Justice League, David, his wife Jennifer, and his two children, Jason and Emma, came under attack by Darkseid's forces. Accepting what he believed to be his fate, and covering his children's eyes for their inevitable death, Graves and his family are saved by the superheroes that would eventually become the Justice League. Believing that the superheroes were a modern incarnation of the gods of antiquity, he set out to research a book about the heroes. It became his most popular title, "Justice League: Gods Among Men". Within a year of the formation of the Justice League, Graves had developed an unspecified malady which left him trapped in a wheelchair and unlikely to last another year. Faced with the knowledge that his family was gone and the heroes were not going to save him, he snapped, shot his doctor, and vanished. Four years later, David Graves returns completely unrecognizable from his former self, with the faces of his children on his inner forearm. Vowing to destroy the Justice League for their hubris, he then breaks into The Black Room, which is A.R.G.U.S.' secret storage facility where they keep the world's most powerful mystical items, stealing the Orb of Ra.

Later, he writes in his journal the best way to destroy the Justice League would be through their public liaison Steve Trevor, whom he mails a copy of his book. Graves interrogates Key, Weapons Master, Scarecrow, Cheetah, Captain Cold and The Scavenger to discover the league heroes weakness. He then kidnapped Steve Trevor and tortured him. Graves got Trevor to break by threatening to kill his family.

Powers and abilities
Little is explained about his powers at the time. He uses spirits to feed off of people's misery, and he has shown to be able to take on the Justice League by using their inner fears against them.

References

External links
 Comic Vine profile
 League #11 Review-Graves first appearance

DC Comics supervillains
Characters created by Geoff Johns
Characters created by Jim Lee
Comics characters introduced in 2012
Fictional historians